James Nixon may refer to:

James Nixon (rugby league) (born 1985), English born Scottish rugby league player
James Nixon (painter) (1741–1812), English miniature painter
James Nixon (American football) (born 1988), American football cornerback
James Henry Nixon (1802–1857), illustrator and painter